Several hills and mountains are named Burke, including:

United States of America 
 Burke Mountain (Arizona), 
 Burke Mountain (North Carolina), 
 Burke Mountain (Vermont), 
 Burke Hill (Montana), 
 Burke Hill (New York), 
 Burke Hill (Washington), 
 Burke Hill (California), 
 Burke Knob, 
 Burke Point, 
 Burke Summit, (Idaho  / Montana ),

Canada 
 Burke Mountain (British Columbia), Canada

See also
 Burke Mountain Ski Area in East Burke, Vermont
 Mount Burke (disambiguation)